Abdoulaye Ly Diori Kadidiatou is the President of the Constitutional Court of Niger, having held this position since 2013.

She is the second woman to hold the position of President of the Constitutional Court of Niger (the first being Salifou Fatimata Bazeye).

Early life and education
Born in 1952 in Niamey, Kadidiatou originally worked as a midwife. She then decided to study at the University of Niamey and in 2005 she obtained a doctorate in public law from the University of Paris-Saclay. She was married to the late Abdoulaye Hamani Diori.

References

1952 births
Living people
Nigerien lawyers
Nigerien judges
Women judges
Constitutional court women judges
National supreme court judges
Academic staff of Paris-Saclay University
People from Niamey
Abdou Moumouni University alumni